Lopopolo is a surname. Notable people with the surname include:

Sandro Lopopolo (1939–2014), Italian boxer
Toni Lopopolo, a literary agent